The Westfjords or West Fjords (ISO 3166-2:IS: IS-4) is a large peninsula in northwestern Iceland and an administrative district, the least populous administrative district. It lies on the Denmark Strait, facing the east coast of Greenland. It is connected to the rest of Iceland by a seven-kilometre-wide isthmus between Gilsfjörður  and Bitrufjörður . The Westfjords are very mountainous; the coastline is heavily indented by dozens of fjords surrounded by steep hills. These indentations make roads very circuitous and communications by land difficult. In addition many of the roads are closed by ice and snow for several months of the year. The Vestfjarðagöng road tunnel from 1996 has improved that situation. The cliffs at Látrabjarg comprise the longest bird cliff in the northern Atlantic Ocean and are at the westernmost point in Iceland. The Drangajökull glacier is located in the north of the peninsula and is the fifth-largest of the country, but the only glacier of the region.

Population
The lack of flat lowlands in the area limits the potential for agriculture, which is mostly restricted to low-intensity sheep grazing near the fjords.  Good natural harbors in many of the fjords and their proximity to fishing areas are vital for the local economy. The Westfjords are very sparsely populated, even by Icelandic standards: the total population in 2020 was 7,115. The district capital and by far the largest settlement is Ísafjörður (population around 4000).

Main settlements in the Westfjords
Reykhólar
Bolungarvík
Brjánslækur 
Ísafjörður
Tálknafjörður
Flateyri
Suðureyri
Hnífsdalur
Súðavík
Bíldudalur
Þingeyri
Patreksfjörður
Skálanes
Hólmavík
Drangsnes

Climate
The box is for Goltur , at the tip of the peninsula 20 km (12 mi) northwest of Ísafjörður. Westfjords is generally the coldest area at sea level in Iceland, because of the East Greenland Current.

Law
In 1615, 32 shipwrecked Basque whalers were killed by locals, after which the magistrate made it law that any Basque person seen in the region should be instantly killed. This law was repealed in May 2015.

Image gallery

See also

Barðaströnd
Bjarkalundur
Westfjords Heritage Museum
Regions of Iceland
Tunnels in Iceland
Basque–Icelandic pidgin

References

External links

Westfjords Tourist Board
Westfjords website
Images from the Westfjords (English and German)
Awarded "EDEN - European Destinations of Excellence" non traditional tourist destination 2010
The Bestfjords blog
Aurora Arktika
Westfjords Tour

 
Peninsulas of Iceland